Pingding County is a county in the east of Shanxi Province, People's Republic of China, bordering Hebei to the east. It is under the jurisdiction of the prefecture-level city of Yangquan, occupying its southeast corner.

Climate

Transportation 
China National Highway 207

References

County-level divisions of Shanxi
Yangquan